Abu Hider Rony (born 14 February 1996) is a Bangladeshi cricketer. He made his international debut for the Bangladesh cricket team in January 2016.

Domestic career
Playing for Gazi Group Cricketers, he took the most wickets in the 2016–17 Dhaka Premier Division Cricket League, with 35 dismissals in 16 matches. Gazi Group Cricketers won the tournament.

In October 2018, he was named in the squad for the Comilla Victorians team, following the draft for the 2018–19 Bangladesh Premier League. In August 2019, he was one of 35 cricketers named in a training camp ahead of Bangladesh's 2019–20 season. In November 2019, he was selected to play for the Cumilla Warriors in the 2019–20 Bangladesh Premier League.

International career
He made his Twenty20 International debut for Bangladesh against Zimbabwe on 20 January 2016.

In August 2018, he was one of twelve debutants to be selected for a 31-man preliminary squad for Bangladesh ahead of the 2018 Asia Cup. He made his One Day International (ODI) debut for Bangladesh against Afghanistan on 20 September 2018. In November 2019, he was named in Bangladesh's squad for the 2019 ACC Emerging Teams Asia Cup in Bangladesh.

References

External links
 
 

1996 births
Living people
Bangladeshi cricketers
Bangladesh One Day International cricketers
Bangladesh Twenty20 International cricketers
Cricketers from Dhaka
Comilla Victorians cricketers
Legends of Rupganj cricketers
Victoria Sporting Club cricketers
Gazi Group cricketers
Bangladesh Central Zone cricketers
People from Netrokona District